Carlos Manuel Hermosillo Goytortúa (born 24 August 1964) is a Mexican former professional footballer who played as a forward. He is also known as El Grandote de Cerro Azul ("The big tall one from Cerro Azul"). He is the fifth all-time leading scorer of the Mexico national team with 34 goals.

Career
Hermosillo started his club career with América during the 1983–84 season. He spent most of his club career in his native Mexico, also playing for Monterrey, Cruz Azul, Necaxa, Atlante, and Chivas. Carlos' best two seasons as a player were in 1994–95 and 1995–96, when he scored 35 and 36 goals respectively for Cruz Azul.

Hermosillo made two stints of career football outside Mexico: Belgium's Standard Liège in 1989–90 and Major League Soccer's LA Galaxy in 1998–99. For Galaxy, he scored 14 goals and 15 assists in two regular seasons, adding five goals and an assist in the playoffs.

On 17 August 1986, he sparked an all-out war with Guadalajara's Fernando Quirarte that included others from either side; he was suspended for 12 games.

Hermosillo was once the all-time goalscoring leader for the national team with 34 goals in official matches and 35 goals in all matches (90 caps between 1984 and 1997). He played in the 1994 FIFA World Cup, in which he could not use his favoured no. 27 jersey due to FIFA's numbering rules for official competitions.

Since 1 December 2006, Carlos Hermosillo was named the minister of Mexico national sporting policy, Comisión Nacional del Deporte (National Commission for Sports). President Felipe Calderón included him in cabinet-level matters.

With an 18-year career with eight different clubs, Hermosillo retired. He last played with Guadalajara in 2001. He had a retirement game playing with Cruz Azul, his favorite team before professional play was Cruz Azul, also he won a championship with Cruz Azul in 1997.

Career statistics
Scores and results list Mexico's goal tally first, score column indicates score after each Hermosillo goal.

Honours
América
Mexican Primera División: 1983–84, 1984–85, Prode-85, 1987–88, 1988–89
Campeón de Campeones: 1988, 1989
CONCACAF Champions' Cup: 1987

Cruz Azul
Mexican Primera División: Invierno 1997
Copa México: 1996–97
CONCACAF Champions' Cup: 1996, 1997

LA Galaxy
Supporters' Shield: 1998

Necaxa
Mexican Primera División: Invierno 1998

Individual
Mexican Primera División Golden Boot: 1993–94, 1994–95, 1995–96
Mexican Primera División Golden Ball: 1994–95
Mexican Primera División Forward of the Tournament: 1994–95, 1995–96
CONCACAF Champions' Cup Golden Boot: 1996, 1997
Copa México Golden Boot: 1995–96, 1996–97
MLS All-Star: 1999

References

External links

International statistics at rsssf

1964 births
Living people
Club América footballers
C.F. Monterrey players
C.D. Guadalajara footballers
Standard Liège players
Cruz Azul footballers
Atlante F.C. footballers
Club Necaxa footballers
LA Galaxy players
Footballers from Veracruz
1986 FIFA World Cup players
1991 CONCACAF Gold Cup players
1994 FIFA World Cup players
1995 King Fahd Cup players
1995 Copa América players
Mexico international footballers
Expatriate footballers in Belgium
Expatriate soccer players in the United States
Mexican expatriate footballers
Mexican footballers
Mexican expatriate sportspeople in Belgium
Mexican expatriate sportspeople in the United States
Mexican civil servants
Belgian Pro League players
Major League Soccer players
Liga MX players
Association football forwards